The El Plan Formation is a geologic formation in Honduras. It preserves fossils probably dating back to the Middle Jurassic period.

Fossil content 
 Brachyphyllum hondurense
 Phlebopteris branneri
 Piazopteris branneri
 Equisetum sp.
 Zamites sp.

See also 
 List of fossiliferous stratigraphic units in Honduras

References

Further reading 
 T. Delevoryas and S. C. Srivastava. 1981. Jurassic plants from the Department of Francisco Morazan, central Honduras. Review of Palaeobotany and Palynology 34:345-357

Geologic formations of Honduras
Jurassic Honduras
Sandstone formations
Shale formations
Shallow marine deposits
Formations